Kalotina is a village in Dragoman Municipality, Sofia Province, in westernmost central Bulgaria. As of 2010 it has 270 inhabitants and the mayor is Lidia Bozhilova. The village is located at the border with Serbia, 55 km to the northwest of the capital Sofia, on the main highway and railway between Western Europe and Asia. Kalotina is known for the Kalotina-Gradinje border checkpoint, one of Bulgaria's busiest and best known due to the proximity to Sofia. The Nishava River, a tributary of the South Morava, flows nearby.

The village was first mentioned in 1453 with its present name. In a 1576 source, it was referred to as Kalotine. Kalotina's name is the feminine form of an adjective derived from the personal name Kalota (Калота); it is an ellipse, as no noun is part of the name.

The village has a medieval Bulgarian Orthodox church dedicated to Saint Nicholas built in the 14th century, during the rule of Ivan Alexander of Bulgaria (as indicated by an inscription in the church). It was richly decorated with murals, although they have been badly preserved. The church donors are thought to have been Deyan and Vladislava from the church in Kučevište, and the church was likely built between 1331 and 1334/7.

References

Villages in Sofia Province
Bulgaria–Serbia border crossings